The Maraehara River is a river of the Gisborne Region in  New Zealand. Rising on the eastern slopes of Mount Whakatiki in the Ruatoria Forest, the river flows eastwards. It flows into the Pacific Ocean, sharing a coastal lagoon with the larger Waiapu River.

See also
List of rivers of New Zealand

References

 New Zealand 1:50000 Topographic Map sheet BD44 - Potara
 New Zealand 1:50000 Topographic Map sheet BD45 - East Cape

Rivers of the Gisborne District
Rivers of New Zealand